The Ferrorama is a Brazilian toy that was very successful among children in the 1980s.

Began to be manufactured in 1980 by Manufatura de Brinquedos Estrela and consisted of a railroad with a steam locomotive or an electric locomotive or both, depending on the kit, and several cars attached, such as coal wagon, loading, fuel, passengers, etc. The locomotives were powered with two medium-size batteries of 1.5 volts each.

The Estrela decided to launch a challenge to be broadcast on Internet: From the enormous pressure on social networks for the relaunch of the rails Ferrorama, the company publicly pledged to relaunch the product in market where fans are able to walk the final 20 km of the Way of St. James with only 110m of track. For that challengers will have to create a logistics so as to take the path that the train has passed and put them back on the front line, without leaving a wagon derail. The challengers will come from internet social communities around the product and the cost of travel to the Galicia will be paid by the company, but it is unknown whether the population from Santiago de Compostela will support the challenge too.

References

External links
Sítio oficial do desafio para a volta do Ferrorama

1980s toys
Toy trains